The Siamese Expeditionary Force (also known as Siamese Volunteer Corps) consisted of the Royal Siamese Army sent to Europe under the command of Major General Phraya Pichai Charnyarit in 1917 to help the Triple Entente fight in World War I.

Background
Siam's decision to declare war was a shrewd political move, but there were precedents from other non-European small states. The decision to send an expeditionary force to Europe, however, was radical. It was designed to demonstrate both Siam's modernity and civilization to the West and the seriousness with which King Rama VI and elite viewed the need to uphold the principles of international law and morality. It was further designed to strengthen Siam's claim to equal treatment in a post-war settlement.

The decision likely evolved from a suggestion by the French government that a volunteer ambulance unit be set up by Siamese students in Europe. French diplomats further suggested that Siam could provide automobile drivers to assist in supplying the troops and aviators, who could be trained at French flying schools as pilots and mechanics.

Siam's army in 1917 was not particularly well-equipped or well-trained for participation in the slaughter of World War I. It possessed little modern equipment or artillery and had no experience of operating in Europe or in a climate or terrain other than its own. It did, however, possess officers trained in modern warfare and military strategy and, importantly, it had a modern flying squadron. No other arm of the military was considered as modern as the air force. The king and his senior diplomats and military officers gladly picked up on the French suggestion.

That the army of a sovereign East Asian nation should fight in Europe was unprecedented and electrifying for the elite and large parts of the general population in Bangkok. Opposition to the decision to become actively involved in the war was limited. Some opponents were politically motivated, as was true of the pro-German members of the elite; opposition also came from religious groups who argued more fundamentally against the involvement of Buddhists in war.

Opposition notwithstanding, the minister of war issued a call for volunteers in September 1917 to form a contingent to display the Siamese National Flag in Europe. He spelled out three objectives: to actively aid the Allies; to gain active military experience; and to uphold national dignity, honor and glory. The assembled expeditionary force consisted of a 414-men-strong aviation corps of pilots and aircraft mechanics and an 870-men-strong motor corps of automobile drivers, mechanics, medical and support staff.

A complete personal account of his wartime experiences with the SEF was written by Sergeant Kleuap Kaysorn, also published in English translation with a commentary.

At the Western Front

While the troops were being assembled, trained and receiving smallpox vaccinations, an advance mission led by Major-General Phraya Pichai Charnyarit (1877-1951), commander of the expeditionary force, traveled to Europe in January 1918 to make preparations for the troops’ arrival. Phraya Bijai had spent several years in Belgium and France, where he had received military training; he spoke French and understood French military culture. In Europe, George V, King of Great Britain (1865-1936) and French Prime Minister Georges Clemenceau (1841-1929) received him and his fellow-officers; they visited the front and made arrangements for the troops in Marseilles and elsewhere.

Months passed with preparations and training in Siam. Once suitable transportation was secured, nearly 1,230 officers and enlisted men boarded the S.S. Empire for Europe on 20 June. They were given a grand send-off by the king and senior princes and by cheering crowds along the banks of the Chao Phraya River. Via Singapore, Colombo and Port Said, the S.S. Empire sailed safely to Marseilles, where she arrived five weeks later on 30 July 1918. While the send-off had been festive, the welcome was rather unceremonious. Although the central purpose of the expeditionary force was to display Siam's military ability and its pride as a sovereign kingdom, French officials briefly mistook the troops for Indochinese troops, to the horror of Siam's diplomats and senior officers assembled in Marseilles. Moreover, the Siamese contingent arrived at a time when some ten thousand American soldiers were arriving in France every day, further diminishing the attention they received from their hosts.

After disembarking, the aviation corps was transferred to training camps at Istres, Avord and Pau, while the transport corps was transferred to a camp at Lyon, where the troops received basic training. After two months in camp, in October 1918 the motor corps was moved to the vicinity of Chalons in the Champagne region behind the front and began supplying troops using French trucks.

Tensions between the Siamese troops and their French liaison officers had been building during the weeks in camp, but under combat conditions they came to a head. The language barrier was a problem; while both the Siamese and the French had recruited as many suitable interpreters as possible, it remained a challenge to communicate effectively with the French officers under battlefield conditions. More importantly, the French army was ill-prepared to integrate the Siamese troops into on-going military operations, largely due to the condescending and racist attitudes prevalent among the French liaison officers. They increasingly abandoned their assigned roles as advisers and began ordering the Siamese troops directly, sidelining the Siamese commanders.

The effect of French behavior on the morale of the troops was disastrous, upsetting the senior Siamese officers, diplomats in Paris, high-ranking military and civilian officials in Bangkok, and even the king himself. When confronted with Siamese accusations, officials at the French foreign ministry understood the danger the situation posed to their goals of having the Siamese troops in France: namely, improving political and commercial relations with Indochina's neighbor. The situation deteriorated so much that the king and his senior advisers contemplated aborting the mission.

End of mission
On 11 November the armistice was signed and fighting ceased, removing much of the pressure from the situation. It was in reaction to these tensions that the French foreign ministry triggered the military command to order the Siamese motor corps to cross into German territory behind their own troops. The Siamese occupation of Germany was thus not the result of a tactical military decision but of a political effort to appease the upset ally. The decision greatly pleased all involved, from the military commanders in Europe to the king in Bangkok himself. In the end, the Siamese were willing to put the animosities behind them and focus on reaping the political benefits from the tremendous effort of deploying troops to Europe.

King Vajiravudh went so far as to describe the day his troops entered German territory as the proudest day of his life. These extraordinary events served the king's ambition to fashion himself as a soldier-king and comrade of the troops. He also wished to use Siam's participation in the war as a vehicle to strengthen national unity and patriotism, with the soldier-king standing at the center of both the nation and the war effort.

The main contingent of the motor corps stayed in the German region of the Palatinate from December 1918 until July 1919, operating primarily in the area around Neustadt. Before embarking for their return journey, Siamese troops participated in the victory parades the Allies organised in Paris, London and Brussels. These parades in July 1919 were highly symbolic opportunities to visually demonstrate Siam's presence in the capitals of the great European powers under the eyes of kings and presidents. Siam had affirmed its presence among the victorious states that had fought to uphold international law, justice and civilization and had defeated brute force and aggression.

In total, nineteen members of the Siamese expeditionary force lost their lives; half of them fell victim to the influenza pandemic, while the remaining deaths resulted from accidents. Looking at the location of death two of the soldiers died in Bangkok during pre-departure training, nine died in France and eight died in Germany during the military occupation. Looking at the times of death half of the deaths occurred over about a one-month period from 22 January to 15 February 1919, including all five deaths in the American Hospital in Paris. These deaths would have been during the first winter the Thai soldiers had ever experienced. None of the Siamese troops died from the enemy fire or other battle-related injuries. The World War Volunteers Memorial honoring the Siamese soldiers who died in the conflict opened on 22 July 1921, in Sanam Luang, central Bangkok. The last surviving member of the Siamese Expeditionary Corps, Yod Sangrungruang, died on 9 October 2003 at age 106.

The expeditionary force returned to Bangkok in two batches. The 400 officers and men of the aviation corps left France without having been to the front and arrived in Siam in May 1919. The motor corps returned to Bangkok in September. For this occasion the government organised the official peace celebrations in which the entire capital and the provincial centres throughout the kingdom seem to have participated. At the end of four days of festivities and religious ceremonies, the ashes of the fallen soldiers were enshrined in a memorial built at a central location close to the Grand Palace and the ministry of war.

Postwar gallery

See also
Siam in World War I

References

Expeditionary units and formations
Military units and formations of Thailand
Wars involving the Rattanakosin Kingdom
1910s in Siam
Military units and formations established in 1917
Military units and formations established in 1919